Natter may refer to:

 Natter (surname)
 Bachem Ba 349, a German manned rocket interceptor from World War II
 Natter, an instant messaging client
 Natter Social Network, a defunct social network